The 2018 Aussie Racing Car Series was an Australian motor racing series open to Aussie Racing Cars, which are silhouette racing cars which use Yamaha FJ1300 engines and Kumho Tyres. It was sanctioned by the Confederation of Australian Motor Sport (CAMS) as an Authorised Series with the Series and Category owner, Aussie Racing Cars Pty Ltd, appointed by CAMS as the Category Manager. The series commenced at Baskerville Raceway in Tasmania on 23 February and concluded on 21 October at the Surfers Paradise Street Circuit. James Duckworth was the defending series winner heading into the 2018 series, but opted not to defend his title.

The series was won by Joel Heinrich.

Teams and drivers 
The following teams and drivers competed in the series.

Calendar 
The series was contested over seven rounds.

Series standings
Series standings after six of seven rounds were as follows:

References

External Links

Aussie Racing Car season